The Progressive Party fielded six candidates in the 1988 provincial election, none of whom were elected.

See also 
 1988 Manitoba general election

References 

Progressive Party of Manitoba (1981–1995) politicians